The NCHC Player of the Year is an annual award given out at the conclusion of the National Collegiate Hockey Conference regular season to the best player in the conference as voted by the coaches of each NCHC team.

The Player of the Year was first awarded in 2014 and is a successor to the CCHA Player of the Year which was discontinued after the conference dissolved due to the 2013–14 NCAA conference realignment.

Award winners

Winners by school

Winners by position

See also
NCHC Awards
List of CCHA Player of the Year

References

External links

College ice hockey trophies and awards in the United States
National Collegiate Hockey Conference